The 2003 Moorilla Hobart International was a tennis tournament played on outdoor hard courts. It was the 10th edition of the event and part of the WTA International tournaments of the 2003 WTA Tour. It took place at the Hobart International Tennis Centre in Hobart, Australia from 6 through 12 January 2003. Unseeded Michaëlla Krajicek won the singles title and earned $22,900 first-prize money.

Singles main-draw entrants

Seeds

1 Rankings as of 19 December 2005.

Other entrants
The following players received wildcards into the singles main draw:
 Casey Dellacqua
 Nicole Pratt

The following players received entry from the qualifying draw:
 Anne Kremer
 Arantxa Parra Santonja
 Olga Puchkova
 Christina Wheeler

The following player received entry as a lucky loser:
 Aleksandra Wozniak

Withdrawals

Before the tournament
 Katarina Srebotnik (gastroenteritis)

Doubles main-draw entrants

Seeds

1 Rankings as of 19 December 2005.

Other entrants
The following pair received wildcards into the singles main draw:
 Lisa D'Amelio /  Emily Hewson

The following pair received entry from the qualifying draw:
 Anne Kremer /  Evgenia Linetskaya

The following pair received entry as lucky losers:
 Mariana Díaz Oliva /  Aleksandra Wozniak

Withdrawals

Before the tournament
 Milagros Sequera (ankle sprain)

Finals

Singles

 Michaëlla Krajicek defeated  Iveta Benešová, 6–2, 6–1.

Doubles

 Émilie Loit' /  Nicole Pratt defeated  Jill Craybas /  Jelena Kostanić, 6–2, 6–1.

References

External links
 ITF tournament edition details
 Tournament draws

 
Hobart International
Moorilla Hobart International
Moorilla Hobart International